Bychki is a rural locality in Baninsky Selsoviet Rural Settlement, Fatezhsky District, Kursk Oblast, Russia. Population:

Geography 
The village is located on the Rzhavets River (a tributary of the Krasavka in the Svapa River basin), 103 km from the Russia–Ukraine border, 54 km north-west of Kursk, 9 km north-west of the district center – the town Fatezh, 5 km from the selsoviet center – Chermoshnoy.

 Climate
Bychki has a warm-summer humid continental climate (Dfb in the Köppen climate classification).

Transport 
Bychki is located 0.5 km from the federal route  Crimea Highway as part of the European route E105, 5 km from the road of regional importance  (Verkhny Lyubazh – Ponyri), on the road of intermunicipal significance  (M2 "Crimea Highway" – Bychki), 26.5 km from the nearest railway halt 34 km (railway line Arbuzovo – Luzhki-Orlovskiye).

The rural locality is situated 57 km from Kursk Vostochny Airport, 176 km from Belgorod International Airport and 238 km from Voronezh Peter the Great Airport.

References

Notes

Sources

Rural localities in Fatezhsky District